Denniston–Steidle House also known as Pineview Farm and the Steidle Farm is a historic home located at New Windsor in Orange County, New York.  It was built about 1875, with a rear ell added in 1915.  It consists of a two-story, three bay, Italianate style main block with a -story rear ell. The farmhouse is a rare example of non-reinforced lime-based concrete construction in the region; the ell is of terra cotta block construction.  Also on the property are the contributing timber frame banked carriage house (c. 1875), terra cotta block wellhouse (c. 1915), and a frame outhouse (c. 1915).

It was listed on the National Register of Historic Places in 2012.

References

Houses on the National Register of Historic Places in New York (state)
Houses completed in 1875
Houses in Orange County, New York
National Register of Historic Places in Orange County, New York